John Singleton Millson (October 1, 1808 – March 1, 1874) was a U.S. Representative from Virginia.

Biography
Born in Norfolk, Virginia, Millson pursued an academic course.
He studied law.
He was admitted to the bar in 1829 and commenced practice in Norfolk.

Millson was elected as a Democrat to the Thirty-first and to the five succeeding Congresses (March 4, 1849 – March 3, 1861).
He served as chairman of the Committee on Revolutionary Pensions (Thirty-second Congress). He is notable as of one of only two Southern Democrats to have voted against the Kansas-Nebraska Act, the other being Thomas Hart Benton.
He resumed the practice of law.
He died in Norfolk, Virginia, March 1, 1874.
He was interred in Cedar Grove Cemetery.

Electoral history

1849; Millson was first elected to the U.S. House of Representatives with 51.67% of the vote, defeating a Whig identified only as Watts.
1851; Millson was re-elected with 59.58% of the vote, defeating Whig Leopold C.P. Cowper.
1853; Millson was re-elected with 56.68% of the vote, defeating Whig Johnathan R. Chambliss and Independent Democrat William D. Roberts.
1855; Millson was re-elected with 53.29% of the vote, defeating American Party Watts.
1857; Millson was re-elected unopposed.
1859; Millson was re-elected with 61.46% of the vote, defeating Independents identified only as Pretlow, Chandler, and Sykes.

Sources

1808 births
1874 deaths
Virginia lawyers
Democratic Party members of the United States House of Representatives from Virginia
19th-century American lawyers
Politicians from Norfolk, Virginia
19th-century American politicians